This is a list of the Spring 1975 PGA Tour Qualifying School graduates. 

The tournament was played at Bay Tree Golf Plantation in North Myrtle Beach, South Carolina in early June and had a field of 233 players. It was reduced from 144 holes to 108 holes and there were no regional qualifiers. A total of 13 players earned their tour card.

Billy Kratzert attempted to qualify at PGA Tour Qualifying Tournament for the second time. He was unsuccessful at 1974 PGA Tour Qualifying School and was unsuccessful again. In his third attempt, Calvin Peete made it onto the PGA Tour.

Sources:

References

1975 1
1975 PGA Tour Qualifying School
PGA Tour Qualifying School Graduates
PGA Tour Qualifying School Graduates